Milk Me is the sixth studio album by American hip hop duo The Beatnuts. It was released on August 31, 2004 via Penalty Recordings/Rykodisc. Recording sessions took place at The Cutting Room in New York. Produced entirely by the Beatnuts, it featured guest appearances from Chris Chandler, Gab Goblin, A.G., Akon, Colion, Freeway, Greg Nice, Milano, Prince Whipper Whip, Rahzel, Tony Touch and Triple Seis.

It was critically received as a solid effort, but barely scraped the Billboard 200, peaking at number 196. In addition, none of its three singles—"Hot", "Find Us" and "It's Nothing"—were able to chart. The album's title was inspired by a phrase uttered by a man in "some porno". The album contains more live instruments—as opposed to sampling—than prior Beatnuts efforts.

Track listing

Personnel

Lester "Psycho Les" Fernandez – vocals, producer, mixing, executive producer
Jerry "JuJu" Tineo – vocals, producer, mixing, executive producer
Eric Krasno – guitar (tracks: 2, 3, 6, 10-12, 15, 17), keyboards (tracks: 9-11), bass (tracks: 11-12)
Neal Evans – keyboards (tracks: 2-4, 6, 17)
Ryan Zoidis – saxophone (track 3)
Rashawn Ross – trumpet (track 3)
Anthony "Roc Raida" Williams – scratches (track 9)
M. "G-Wise" Herald – talkbox (tracks: 11, 17)
Gregory "Greg Nice" Mays – vocals (track 2)
James "Prince Whipper Whip" Whipper II – vocals (track 3)
Andre "A.G." Barnes – vocals (track 4)
G. "Gab Goblin" Mendez – vocals (tracks: 4, 14)
Aliaune "Akon" Thiam – vocals (track 6)
Leslie "Freeway" Pridgen – vocals (track 7)
Rahzel Brown – vocals (track 9)
Chris Chandler – vocals (tracks: 10, 17)
Eileen Cruz – additional vocals (track 10)
Sammy "Triple Seis" Garcia – vocals (track 12)
D. "Colion" Le Noir – vocals (track 12)
Joseph "Tony Touch" Hernandez – vocals (track 14)
Rudy "Milano" Morgan – vocals (track 15)
Jeremy "Cochise" Ball – recording, mixing
Michael Sarsfield – mastering
Henley Halem – executive producer, A&R
Neil Levine – executive producer
Stacy Karp – coordinator
Anita B. – art direction, design
Mark Mann – photography
Michelle Arnold – A&R
Theo Sedlmayr – legal
Lori Landrew – legal

Charts

References

External links

2004 albums
Rykodisc albums
The Beatnuts albums
Albums produced by the Beatnuts